is a 157-meter high-rise building located in Akasaka, Tokyo.

The 43 floor 71,339-square-meter residential condominium tower was completed in 2009 and houses 521 units. It features a sky lounge on the 36–37th floors, a rooftop terrace, and underground parking.

The building is located in central Tokyo next to Aoyama-dori and the Akasaka Imperial Grounds with Akasaka Palace and Togu Palace, and within 10 minutes walk of Tokyo Metro stations Aoyama-itchōme, Akasaka, Akasaka-mitsuke, Nagatachō, Kokkai-gijidō-mae and Tameike-Sannō, with access to Ginza Line, Hanzōmon Line, Marunouchi Line, Yūrakuchō Line, Chiyoda Line, Namboku Line and the Toei Ōedo Line.

See also

List of tallest structures in Tokyo

References

External links
  

Residential skyscrapers in Tokyo
Buildings and structures in Minato, Tokyo
Residential buildings completed in 2009
Mitsui Fudosan
2009 establishments in Japan
Akasaka, Tokyo